Bowleg Bill is an American fakelore folk hero, a Wyoming cowboy hand who went seafaring.

Books
 Jeremiah Digges, Bowleg Bill, The Sea-Going Cowboy, Viking Press. NY. 1938. First edition , ASIN:  B000ILSNLE
Also printed as Bowleg Bill, the sea-going cowboy;: Or, Ship ahoy & let 'er buck! ASIN: B00086NDPK
The book is a compilation of tall tales about a cowboy born in Wyoming to become a sailor, never an able-bodied one, but with many adventures, including the luring of whales with his music, capturing a mermaid, mutineering.
"The Strange Adventure of the Cowboy-Sailor" in a 1948 collection New England bean-pot; American folk stories to read and to tell. tells a story of Bowleg Bill meeting giant sea serpent and embark on a quest to find woman named Keziah.
Harold W. Felton, Bowleg Bill, Seagoing Cowpuncher, Englewood Cliffs, New Jersey, Prentice-Hall, 1957. From review: " The exuberant chronicle of the exploits of Bowleg Bill, an eight-foot cowboy who rides herd on tuna fish and she-whales and he-whales, makes the most of two professions given to tall tales -- whaling and bronco-busting. The mixture of the jargon of the range and the poop-deck add to the incongruity of this beef-and-blubber comedy."
Wyatt Blassingame, Bowleg Bill, Seagoing Cowboy, Garrard Publishing Company; first edition, 1976,

References

Fakelore
Fictional characters from Wyoming
Fictional cowboys and cowgirls
Tall tales